Fernando Zúñiga (born 6 January 1968) is a Chilean-born Swiss linguist at the University of Bern, where he holds the chair of General Linguistics and works in the fields of linguistic typology and indigenous languages of the Americas, especially Mapudungun and Algonquian languages.

Partial bibliography
 Mapudungun, Munich: LINCOM Europa, 2000 
 Deixis and Alignment. Inverse systems in indigenous languages of the Americas, Amsterdam/Philadelphia: John Benjamins, 2006, 
 Mapudungun: el habla mapuche. Introducción a la lengua mapuche, con notas comparativas y un CD, Santiago de Chile: Centro de Estudios Públicos, 2006, 
 Benefactives and Malefactives. Typological perspectives and case studies, co-edited with Seppo Kittilä, Amsterdam/Philadelphia: John Benjamins, 2010, 
 Word Formation in South American Languages, co-edited with Swintha Danielsen and Katja Hannss, Amsterdam/Philadelphia: John Benjamins, 2014, 
 Advances in Research on Semantic Roles, co-edited with Seppo Kittilä, Amsterdam/Philadelphia: John Benjamins, 2016, 
 Typological Hierarchies in Synchrony and Diachrony, co-edited with Sonia Cristofaro, Amsterdam/Philadelphia: John Benjamins, 2017, 
 Grammatical Voice, co-authored with Seppo Kittilä, Cambridge: Cambridge University Press, 2019, 
 Mapudungun: el habla mapuche. Introducción a la lengua mapuche, con notas comparativas y audio, Santiago de Chile: Fondo de Cultura Económica / Centro de Estudios Públicos, 2022,

References

External links
 Home page at the University of Bern

1968 births
Living people
Linguists from Switzerland
Linguists of Mapuche